Enrique Reed Valenzuela (15 August 1915 – 11 May 1958) was a Chilean chess player, Chilean Chess Championship winner (1932).

Biography
Enrique Reed was a Chilean chess prodigy. In 1927, in Santiago he lost in a fifty move game against Alexander Alekhine in simultaneous exhibition. In 1932, Enrique Reed won Chilean Chess Championship. He participated in International Chess Tournaments in Mar del Plata (1944) and Viña del Mar (1945, 1947).

Enrique Reed played for Chile in the Chess Olympiads:
 In 1939, at reserve board in the 8th Chess Olympiad in Buenos Aires (+10, =1, -5).

References

External links

Enrique Reed chess games at 365chess.com

1915 births
1958 deaths
Chilean chess players
Chess Olympiad competitors
20th-century chess players